The USC School of Architecture is the architecture school at the University of Southern California. Located in Los Angeles, California, it is one of the university's twenty-two professional schools, offering both undergraduate and graduate degrees in the fields of architecture, building science, landscape architecture and heritage conservation.

The USC School of Architecture has enrolled over 6,500 alumni and is consistently ranked among the most prestigious architecture schools in the United States. For 2018, the undergraduate program in architecture was ranked 5th, and the graduate program in architecture was ranked 9th in the nation by DesignIntelligence. Since its founding as a department in 1914, the school has produced some of the world's leading architects, including Frank Gehry, Paul R. Williams, Pierre Koenig and Thom Mayne, among others. The current dean of the school is Willow Bay and faculty comprises notable architects including Alvin Huang, Wes Jones, Lorcan O'Herlihy and Lawrence Scarpa.

History

The program at USC began as an architecture department in 1914. Soon after, with the help of the Allied Architects of Los Angeles, a separate School of Architecture was established in 1925. By 1928, majors and degree-granting programs were provided to students. One of the earliest undergraduate programs was the 5-year professional Bachelor of Architecture program. Over the years, the school grew and expanded its influence into one of the premier architecture programs in the country. The school now offers 3 undergraduate degrees, 3 undergraduate minors, 4 master's degrees and 1 Ph.D.

The current main buildings are Watt Hall & Harris Hall. Watt Hall was built in 1974 and designed by alumnus Edward Killingsworth ('40).

USC Architecture took over maintenance of the Gamble House, the Craftsman masterpiece in Pasadena designed by Greene and Greene in 1966 in a joint deed with the city of Pasadena, which took over responsibility for the grounds.  The school also owns the Samuel Freeman House, a Frank Lloyd Wright designed house in the Hollywood Hills of Los Angeles built in 1923. The Freeman house was listed on the National Register of Historic Places in 1971. The house has also been listed as a California Historical Landmark #1011, and as Los Angeles Historic-Cultural Monument #247 in 1981.  The Freeman house is undergoing long-term stabilization and rehabilitation.

Fields of Study

Undergraduate Architecture
Director: Doris SungThe undergraduate "B. Arch" is accredited by the National Architectural Accrediting Board. The "NAAB" is the sole authority for granting accreditation for professional architecture degree programs.

Graduate Architecture
Director: Alvin HuangThe graduate "M. Arch" is accredited by the National Architectural Accrediting Board.  As an accredited professional degree, the M.Arch provides firm grounding knowledge in history, technology, professional practice and theory.  The studio is the core setting for students to learn to synthesize the cultural, environmental and tectonic thinking through informed design practice.   The separate Master of Advanced Architecture Studies (MAAS) is a post-professional degree for those who already have a Bachelor of Architecture degree.

Graduate Heritage Conservation
Director: Trinidad RicoThe graduate heritage conservation curriculum is designed to expose students to the full breadth of the profession, including "...materials conservation, policy and planning, conservation theory, global conservation efforts, architectural and landscape history, best-practices in resource documentation and evaluation, sustainability, and historic site management."

Graduate Landscape Architecture + Urbanism
Director: Alison HirschLandscape architecture at USC is a design-centered program centered on a trans-disciplinary approach.  The Master of Landscape Architecture is accredited by the Landscape Architectural Accreditation Board (LAAB).

Graduate Building Science
Director: Kyle Konis, Ph.D., AIAThe Master of Building Science (MBS) degree program was recognized as a "top-notch program" by ARCHITECT: Journal of the American Institute of Architects, in 2009. Building science focuses on the relationship of the human condition and to natural forces.  The USC Chase L. Leavitt Graduate Building Science program emphasizes the breadth of technology in architecture, including structures, building systems, analytical computing and BIM, building envelopes, design theories and methods, human comfort, sustainability, acoustics, lighting and daylighting.

Facilities

The School of Architecture is located in the Harris Hall and Watt Hall Complex, at the southern end of the USC University Park Campus. Students in the USC School of Architecture have their own 24-7 personal workstations. Students have access to their projects at all times. Watt Hall contains one of the best regional architecture libraries, and is home to extensive woodshop and fabrication facilities. The complex also houses several gallery review spaces and, next door, the "USC Fisher Museum of Art".

Faculty

Many of the faculty members at the School of Architecture are practicing professionals and researchers. The majority of the faculty are active members of the American Institute of Architects (AIA) or the American Society of Landscape Architects (ASLA) and 14 are  Fellows of AIA (FAIA).

Notable Faculty:
Milton S. F. Curry
Manuel De Landa (adjunct)
Steven Ehrlich - FAIA
Diane Ghirardo - Ph.D.
Alvin Huang - AIA
Wes Jones - RA, FAAR
Karen M. Kensek
Alice Kimm - FAIA
Qingyun Ma - AIA
Douglas E. Noble - FAIA, Ph.D.
Lorcan O'Herlihy - FAIA
Victor A. Regnier FAIA
Lawrence Scarpa - FAIA
Marc Eugene Schiler - FASES, LC
Doris Sung
Patrick Tighe - FAIA

Notable Former Faculty:

Gregory Ain - Best known for bringing elements of modern architecture to lower and medium-cost housing.
Reyner Banham
Craig Ellwood
A. Quincy Jones - Professor and later Dean of the School of Architecture from 1951-1967. Designed the building which houses the USC Annenberg School for Communication and Journalism.
Calvin C. Straub - Professor & Dean, Considered the father of California Post & Beam architecture. Early inventor of Mid-Century modernism with other USC faculty-Case Study Architect.
Pierre Koenig
Ralph Lewis Knowles
Raymond Loewy - internationally acclaimed industrial designer.
Richard Neutra - Considered among the most important modernist architects.
William L. Pereira - Joined faculty in 1949. Notable works include the Transamerica Pyramid in San Francisco and Geisel Library at UC San Diego. Designed the campus plans of USC, UC Irvine, and Pepperdine University.

Notable Former Visiting Faculty:

Stan Allen
Tadao Ando
Will Bruder
Peter Cook
Frank Gehry
Rem Koolhaas
Mia Lehrer
Michael Maltzan
Cesar Pelli
Kazuyo Sejima & Ryue Nishizawa
Ma Yansong

Alumni

Many of the students that have graduated from the USC School of Architecture have moved on to be leading figures in the architectural community.

 Gregory Ain - Attended the School from 1927-1928. Former professor at the USC School of Architecture and Dean of the school of architecture at Pennsylvania State University.
Barry Berkus - B. Arch. Designed more than 600,000 houses.
 Conrad Buff III - Partner in architecture firm  Buff, Smith and Hensman
 Boris Dramov - B. Arch, 1966. Notable works include Martin Luther King, Jr. Memorial and Third Street Promenade.
Behnaz Farahi - M. Arch, 2012. Interactive designer and creative technologist.
 Frank O. Gehry - B. Arch, 1954. Notable works include the Guggenheim Museum Bilbao, Walt Disney Concert Hall, Experience Music Project, and Dancing House. Pritzker Prize laureate.
 Donald C. Hensman - Partner in architecture firm  Buff, Smith and Hensman
Alvin Huang - B.Arch 1998. Principle in architecture firm Synthesis Design + Architecture. Associate Professor at the USC School of Architecture.
 Jon Jerde - B. Arch, 1966. Notable works include Canal City Hakata, Mall of America, Westfield Horton Plaza, and Universal CityWalk in Los Angeles.
 Edward Killingsworth - B. Arch. 1940. Participated in the Case Study Houses experiment. Master planning architect for California State University, Long Beach for over 40 years. Designed Watt Hall and the University Religious Center at USC. 
 Pierre Koenig - B. Arch, 1952.
 William Krisel - B.Arch 1949. noted mid-century modern architect
Mark Lee - B.Arch 1991. Partner in architecture firm JohnstonMarkLee. Appointed the chair of the department of architecture at Harvard University Graduate School of Design in 2018.
 Thom Mayne - B. Arch, 1968. Notable works include the Caltrans District 7 Headquarters and the San Francisco Federal Building. Pritzker Prize laureate.
 Albert Nozaki - B. Arch, 1933. Academy-Award nominated art director for Paramount Pictures. Known for work on The War of the Worlds and The Ten Commandments. Career was disrupted when he was interned at Manzanar during World War II.
 Raphael Soriano - B. Arch, 1934.
 Calvin C. Straub - B. Arch, 1943.
 Paul Revere Williams - B. Arch, 1934. Designed homes for numerous celebrities including Frank Sinatra, Lucille Ball, and Desi Arnaz. First African American member and Fellow of the American Institute of Architects. Recipient of the 2017 AIA Gold Medal. 
 Zelma Wilson - B. Arch, 1947.

References

External links

Architecture schools in California
Architecture
Educational institutions established in 1925
University subdivisions in California
1925 establishments in California